Hawk Mountain may refer to:

 Hawk Mountain, mountain in Pennsylvania 
 Hawk Mountain Ranger School, a Civil Air Patrol search and rescue training activity 
 Hawk Mountain (New York), a mountain in New York
 Hawk Mountain (Alberta), a mountain in Alberta
 Hawk Mountain Sanctuary, bird of prey refuge in Pennsylvania